The 2008–09 NCAA Division I men's basketball season began on November 10, 2008, and ended with the 2009 NCAA Division I men's basketball tournament's championship game on April 6, 2009, at Ford Field in Detroit, Michigan. The season saw six different teams achieve the AP #1 ranking during the year (just one shy of the NCAA record). Oklahoma sophomore Blake Griffin was the dominant individual performer, sweeping National Player of the Year honors. The season began with North Carolina becoming the first unanimous preseason #1 team, and ended with the Tar Heels dominating the NCAA tournament en route to their fifth NCAA title. UNC won its six NCAA tournament games by double digits, and by an average of 19.8 points per game. Junior Wayne Ellington was named Final Four Most Outstanding Player.

Season headlines 
 The North Carolina Tar Heels became the first team in history to be the unanimous #1 team in the AP preseason poll. The ranking came based on UNC returning the majority of their Final Four squad from the year before, most notably Tyler Hansbrough, who became the first reigning National player of the year to return to school since Shaquille O'Neal in the 1991–92 season.
 Blake Griffin was named the Associated Press, the John Wooden Award, the Naismith Award and the Sporting News player of the year for the 2008–2009 college basketball season. When combined with Sam Bradford's Heisman Trophy, Oklahoma became the first school to have a top winner in both basketball and football in the same year.
 Pittsburgh achieved the #1 ranking for the first time in school history on January 5, 2009.
 On December 18, Tyler Hansbrough passed Phil Ford to become North Carolina's all-time leading scorer. On February 28, Hansbrough also broke Dickie Hemric's NCAA record for most free throws made in a career. And on March 19, Hansbrough passed JJ Redick as the leading scorer in Atlantic Coast Conference history.
 Jodie Meeks of Kentucky scored 54 points against Tennessee on January 13, 2009. Meeks was 10–15 from 3-pt range. The output broke Kentucky's single-game scoring record, set by Hall of Famer Dan Issel 39 years before.
 2009 marked the first time in history that three #1 seeds in the NCAA tournament came from the same conference – as Louisville, Pittsburgh and Connecticut of the Big East achieved the feat.
 Two retired Hall of Fame coaches died during the season – UTEP's Don Haskins on September 7, 2008, and California's Pete Newell on November 17, 2008. Newell's Bears won the NCAA championship in 1959, while Haskins' Miners won the title in 1966 in a historic win over Kentucky.
 The preseason AP All-American team was named on November 3. Tyler Hansbrough of North Carolina was the unanimous leading vote-getter (72 of 72 votes). The rest of the team included Stephen Curry of Davidson (66 votes), Luke Harangody of Notre Dame (58), Darren Collison of UCLA (46) and Blake Griffin of Oklahoma (45).
 Kenny George of UNC Asheville, the tallest player in Division I (7'7") and the nation's leader in FG% for 2007–08, had part of his right foot amputated before the start of the season, threatening to end his career.
 The New Jersey Institute of Technology broke a 51-game losing streak that stretched back to February 19, 2007, by defeating Bryant 61–51 on January 21.
 Travis and Chavis Holmes of VMI became the highest-scoring twins in NCAA Division I history.
 Ryan Toolson of Utah Valley had the highest single-game scoring mark of the season, netting 63 points in a 123–121 quadruple-overtime win over Chicago State on January 29, 2009. Chicago State teammates David Holston and John Cantrell each scored over 40 points in the loss.
 On January 31, Texas's A. J. Abrams hit his 339th 3-point shot, breaking the previous Big 12 record of 338 held by Jeff Boschee of Kansas. In the same game, Kansas State's Denis Clemente tied his former teammate Michael Beasley's Big 12 single-game scoring record, netting 44 points in an 85–81 overtime win for the Wildcats.
 North Dakota State became the first men's team in Division I or its predecessors to reach the NCAA Tournament in its first year of postseason eligibility since 1972, when Southwestern Louisiana, now Louisiana-Lafayette, accomplished this feat. The Bison reached the "Big Dance" by defeating Oakland in the final of the 2009 Summit League tournament on March 10.
 Syracuse upset Connecticut, 127–117, in a six-overtime game in the Big East Conference tournament Quarterfinals that started on March 12 and ended after midnight on March 13. It was the longest game in Big East history, and second longest in NCAA Division I history, at 70 total playing minutes.
 Davidson guard Stephen Curry, Boston College guard Tyrese Rice, Miami (FL) guard Jack McClinton, Florida State guard Toney Douglas, Temple guard Dionte Christmas, UAB guard Robert Vaden, Wyoming guard Brandon Ewing, Chicago State guard David Holston, UTEP guard Stefon Jackson, Central Florida guard Jermaine Taylor, North Dakota State guard Ben Woodside, VMI guard Chavis Holmes, East Tennessee State guard Courtney Pigram and Coppin State guard Tywain McKee each eclipsed the career 2000-point mark during the season.
 Arkansas State changed its nickname from the "Indians" to the "Red Wolves", effective this season.
 Bryant University and Southern Illinois University Edwardsville competed at the Division I level for the first time, while Houston Baptist returned to Division I play after a 20-year absence and Seattle after 28 years.
 Conference realignments: Gardner-Webb moved from the Atlantic Sun Conference to the Big South Conference, while Presbyterian competes in the Big South as well after playing as an independent in 2007–08. Samford moved from the Ohio Valley Conference to the Southern Conference.
 Don Meyer passed Bob Knight as the winningest coach in NCAA history, breaking Knight's record of 902 victories.
 Syracuse coach Jim Boeheim led the Orange to 20 wins for the 31st time in his career, a new record. Boeheim had previously been tied with Dean Smith at 30 20-win seasons.
 Connecticut coach Jim Calhoun won his 800th career game, beating Marquette on February 25, 2009.
 After the season, Northeastern's basketball program was placed on probation until 2011 due to recruiting and extra-benefits violations.
 Centenary became the first men's basketball to receive a postseason ban due to their poor showing against Academic Progress Rate (APR) standards. The Gentlemen will not be eligible for postseason play for the 2009–10 season.
 27,767,111 fans attended Division I games during the season, the second-highest all-time for the division.
 Larry Bird, Magic Johnson, Jud Heathcote, Wayman Tisdale, Gene Bartow, Travis Grant, Walter Byers and Bill Wall were inducted into the National Collegiate Basketball Hall of Fame.
 During the 2008–09 Big Ten season, Evan Turner and Manny Harris became the 4th and 5th players to finish in the top ten in the Big Ten Conference in average points rebounds and assists in the same season since assists became a statistic in 1983–84. Harris is the first to finish in the top six in each one. Turner would finish in the top two the following year.
  beats Boston College for its first-ever win against a ranked opponent. During the 2008–09 Ivy League season, Harvard's Jeremy Lin was the only NCAA Division I men's college basketball player who ranked in the top ten in his conference for scoring (17.8), rebounding (5.5), assists (4.3), steals (2.4), blocked shots (0.6), field goal percentage (0.502), free throw percentage (0.744), and 3-point shot percentage (0.400).

Major rule changes 
Beginning in 2008–2009, the following rules changes were implemented:
 The three-point line moved from 19 feet, 9 inches to 20 feet, 9 inches.
 If the entire ball is above the rim when it comes into contact with the backboard and is subsequently touched by a player, it is goaltending. Previously only a ball moving downward after hitting the backboard could be subject to goaltending.

Season outlook

Pre-season polls 

The top 25 from the AP and ESPN/USA Today Coaches Polls, October 31, 2008.

Conference membership changes 

These schools joined new conferences for the 2008–09 season.

Regular season

Early-season tournaments 

 *Although these tournaments technically have more teams involved, only 4 can play for the championship.

Conference winners and tournaments 
Thirty athletic conferences each end their regular seasons with a single-elimination tournament. The teams in each conference that win their regular season title are given the number one seed in each tournament. The winners of these tournaments receive automatic invitations to the 2009 NCAA Division I men's basketball tournament. The Ivy League does not have a conference tournament, instead giving their automatic invitation to their regular-season champion Cornell.

Statistical leaders

Conference standings

Post-season tournaments

NCAA tournament 

The NCAA Tournament tipped off on March 18, 2009, with the opening round game in Dayton, Ohio, and concluded on April 6 at the Ford Field in Detroit, Michigan. Of the 65 teams that were invited to participate, 31 were automatic bids while 34 were at-large bids. The 34 at-large teams came from 8 conferences, with the Big East, ACC and Big Ten each receiving seven bids. The Big 12 and Pac-10 each received six bids. The SEC and Atlantic 10 each received three bids. This season also marked the first time that three teams from the same conference were selected as #1 seeds (Louisville, Pittsburgh and Connecticut). North Carolina tore through the tournament, winning each game by 12 or more points and beating Michigan State in the Final 89–72 behind an NCAA-record 55 first-half points to win its fifth National Championship. Ty Lawson recorded a record 8 steals, while Wayne Ellington was named tournament Most Outstanding Player.

Final Four – Ford Field, Detroit, Michigan

National Invitation tournament 

After the NCAA Tournament field was announced, the National Invitation Tournament invited 32 teams to participate. Five teams were automatic qualifiers for winning their conference regular-season championships, while the remaining 27 bids were named from an at-large pool. Notable entrants included Kentucky, who broke a 17-year NCAA tournament appearance streak by missing the field, as well as preseason top ten team Notre Dame and 2008 Regional Finalist Davidson. Penn State defeated Baylor 69–63 in the Final on April 2. The Nittany Lions' Jamelle Cornley was named tournament Most Outstanding Player.

NIT Semifinals and Final 
Played at Madison Square Garden in New York City on March 31 and April 2

College Basketball Invitational 

The second College Basketball Invitational (CBI) Tournament was held beginning March 17 and ended with a best-of-three final, ending March 30. It was the second year that the CBI tournament has conducted a post-season tournament. Oregon State defeated UTEP 2-1 in the final series to win the title. Oregon State's Roeland Schaftenaar was named tournament MVP.

CollegeInsider.com tournament 

The inaugural CollegeInsider.com Postseason Tournament was held beginning March 17 and ended with a championship game on March 30. This tournament places an emphasis on selecting successful teams from "mid-major" conferences who were left out of the NCAA Tournament and NIT. Old Dominion defeated Bradley 66–62 to win the first CIT championship in Peoria, Illinois. The Monarchs' Frank Hassell was named tournament MVP.

Award winners

Consensus All-American teams

Major player of the year awards 
 Wooden Award: Blake Griffin, Oklahoma
 Naismith Award: Blake Griffin, Oklahoma
 Associated Press Player of the Year: Blake Griffin, Oklahoma
 NABC Player of the Year: Blake Griffin, Oklahoma
 Oscar Robertson Trophy (USBWA): Blake Griffin, Oklahoma
 Adolph Rupp Trophy: Blake Griffin, Oklahoma
 CBS/Chevrolet Player of the Year: Blake Griffin, Oklahoma
 Sporting News Player of the Year: Blake Griffin, Oklahoma

Major freshman of the year awards 
 USBWA Freshman of the Year: Tyreke Evans, Memphis
 Sporting News Freshman of the Year: Tyreke Evans, Memphis

Major coach of the year awards 
 Associated Press Coach of the Year: Bill Self, Kansas
 Henry Iba Award (USBWA): Bill Self, Kansas
 NABC Coach of the Year: Mike Anderson, Missouri & John Calipari, Memphis
 Naismith College Coach of the Year: Jamie Dixon, Pittsburgh
 CBS/Chevrolet Coach of the Year: Bill Self, Kansas
 Adolph Rupp Cup: Rick Pitino, Louisville
 Sporting News Coach of the Year: Bill Self, Kansas

Other major awards 
 Bob Cousy Award (Best point guard): Ty Lawson, North Carolina
 Pete Newell Big Man Award (Best big man): Blake Griffin, Oklahoma
 NABC Defensive Player of the Year: Hasheem Thabeet, Connecticut
 Frances Pomeroy Naismith Award (Best player 6'0"/1.83 m or shorter): Darren Collison, UCLA
 Lowe's Senior CLASS Award (top senior): Tyler Hansbrough, North Carolina
 Robert V. Geasey Trophy (Top player in Philadelphia Big 5): Ahmad Nivins, St. Joseph's
 NIT/Haggerty Award (Top player in New York City metro area): Charles Jenkins, Hofstra
 Chip Hilton Player of the Year Award (Strong personal character): Jon Brockman, Washington

Coaching changes 
A number of teams changed coaches throughout the season and after the season ended.

References